James Conley Justice II (born April 27, 1951) is an American businessman and politician who has served as the 36th governor of West Virginia since 2017. Justice had a net worth of $1.2 billion in September 2018, making him the wealthiest person in West Virginia, though it has declined to $513.3 million as of October 2021. He inherited a coal mining business from his father and built a business empire with 94 companies, including the Greenbrier, a luxury resort in White Sulphur Springs.

In 2015, Justice announced his candidacy for governor in the 2016 West Virginia gubernatorial election. Although a registered Republican before running for governor, he ran as a Democrat and defeated the Republican nominee, Bill Cole. Less than seven months after taking office, Justice switched back to the Republican Party after announcing his plans at a rally with U.S. president Donald Trump in the state. In the 2020 gubernatorial race, he was reelected over Democratic challenger Ben Salango.

Early life and education
James Conley Justice II was born in Charleston, West Virginia, the son of James Conley Justice and Edna Ruth (née Perry) Justice. Justice grew up in Raleigh County, West Virginia. He enrolled at the University of Tennessee on an athletic scholarship for golf, but transferred to Marshall University. At Marshall, he was a two-year captain on the Thundering Herd golf team. He earned his bachelor's degree and Master of Business Administration from Marshall.

Business career
After college, Justice went into the family agriculture business. He founded Bluestone Farms in 1977, which now operates  of farmland, and is the leading producer of grain on the East Coast of the United States. During that time, he also developed Stoney Brook Plantation, a 15,000-acre hunting and fishing preserve in Monroe County. Justice is a seven-time national corn growing champion. After his father's death in 1993, Justice inherited ownership of Bluestone Industries and Bluestone Coal Corporation. In 2009, he sold some of his coal business to the Russian company Mechel for $568 million. In 2015, after a huge drop in the price of coal led Mechel to close some of the mines, he bought the business back for $5 million. Since buying back the mine from Mechel, Justice reopened several of the mines and hired over 200 miners.

Justice's mining companies have been scrutinized for alleged cases of safety violation and unpaid taxes; in 2016, NPR called him the nation's "top mine safety delinquent". Justice allegedly owed millions of dollars to the government in back taxes, and unpaid coal mining fees and fines: "His mining companies owe $15 million in six states, including property and minerals taxes, state coal severance and withholding taxes, and federal income, excise and unemployment taxes, as well as mine safety penalties, according to county, state and federal records." Two debt-related lawsuits were settled in 2019, and in 2020 mining companies Justice or his family owned agreed to pay $5 million in delinquent safety fines.

According to a ProPublica investigation, Justice paid more than $128 million in judgments and settlements over his businesses' unpaid bills.

Forbes estimates Justice's net worth at $513.3 million as of October 2021. Justice serves as the owner or chief executive officer of over 50 companies, including the Greenbrier in White Sulphur Springs, West Virginia, which he bought for $20.5 million in 2009, preventing its bankruptcy. He is in the process of building a new mountaintop golf course with golfers Jack Nicklaus, Gary Player, and Lee Trevino. Arnold Palmer was involved before his 2016 death.

As of 2014, Justice owned 70 active mines in five states. His charitable activities have included $25 million for the James C. Justice National Scout Camp at The Summit Bechtel Family National Scout Reserve, $5 million for Marshall University, and $10 million to the Cleveland Clinic. Justice gives away more than $1 million in Christmas gifts annually through the Dream Tree for Kids campaign.

Before taking office as governor, Justice resigned from all the executive positions he held. He placed his daughter Jill in charge of the Greenbrier and his son Jay in charge of his mining and agriculture businesses. He said he would place all his assets in a blind trust, but that the process would take time because of their complexity. During the 2020 COVID-19 pandemic, Justice and his family's businesses received at least between $11 million and $24 million in aid through the Paycheck Protection Program. His luxury resort, the Greenbrier Hotel Corporation, received a loan of between $5 million and $10 million, but the company did not promise to retain any jobs in exchange for the aid.

As governor of West Virginia, Justice is in charge of the state agencies that regulate many of his businesses.

Governor of West Virginia

Elections

2016 

In 2015, Justice declared his candidacy for governor of West Virginia in the 2016 election as a member of the Democratic Party. He had been a registered member of the Republican Party until changing his registration in February 2015. This was his first time running for political office. In May 2016, Justice won the Democratic nomination for governor and ran against Republican nominee Bill Cole in the general election. On November 8, Justice won the election.

Justice was endorsed by the United Mine Workers.

2020 

In January 2019, Justice declared his candidacy for reelection. This time, he ran as a Republican, having changed his party registration after a 2017 rally with President Donald Trump. He defeated multiple challengers in the Republican primary.

In the general election campaign, Justice focused on his COVID-19 response, the state's budget surplus, and his work on the substance abuse crisis. Several polls had him leading by a large margin over Kanawha County Commissioner Ben Salango in the months preceding Election Day. On November 3, 2020, he defeated Salango with over 63% of the vote to Salango's 30%. With his win, he became the first West Virginian Republican gubernatorial candidate to win since Cecil Underwood in 1996 and the first GOP incumbent to win a second term since Arch A. Moore Jr. in 1976.

The United Mine Workers endorsed Salango after having endorsed Justice in 2016. But Justice was endorsed by the West Virginia Coal Association, which said he had "worked to protect the miners, increase coal production, and explore innovative ways to use coal for new products and downstream job opportunities".

Tenure 

Justice took office as governor on January 16, 2017. He is known for using colorful metaphors and digs at political opponents.

To improve West Virginia's budget situation, he has proposed raising the state's revenue by $450 million, primarily by increasing the consumer sales tax, reinstituting the business and occupation (B & O) tax, and establishing a "rich man's" tax. He also opposed plans to cut health and education spending. On April 13, 2017, while vetoing a budget bill passed by the West Virginia legislature, Justice said the bill was "nothing more than a bunch of political you-know-what" and showed a prop featuring bull feces on a print copy of the bill.

On August 3, 2017, Justice announced that he had rejoined the Republican Party. He made the announcement at a rally hosted by President Donald Trump in Huntington and also confirmed his support for Trump. Justice said he was returning to the GOP because he could not support Trump as a member of the Democratic Party. The announcement came as a surprise to his own staff. This also made Justice the first Republican governor of West Virginia since Cecil Underwood in 2001.

Even after switching to the Republican Party, Justice initially supported incumbent Democrat Joe Manchin for reelection in the 2018 Senate election in West Virginia. Later in the general election, Justice endorsed Republican Senate candidate Patrick Morrisey. In February 2021, when asked by The New York Times whether he planned to run against Manchin, Justice said, "No, I’m really not . . . [i]f I can continue to do good stuff for West Virginia, I’m going to do it, and then probably fade off into the sunset."

In 2020, Justice signed into law the Critical Infrastructure Protection Act, which created felony penalties for protests targeting oil and gas facilities. The law, which was passed with the support of Dominion Energy, the West Virginia Oil and Natural Gas Association, and the American Fuel and Petrochemical Manufacturers trade association, was described by its sponsor John Kelly as having been "requested by the natural gas industry".

In January 2022, Justice postponed his annual State of the State address because he had contracted COVID-19 and was isolating at home.

Political positions
Justice began his gubernatorial campaign and political career as a conservative Democrat. Time identified him as a moderate Democrat. He switched to the Republican Party a few months after taking office and declared his support for President Donald Trump.

Economic policy 

Justice campaigned and has governed with support for the coal industry. He does not support raising taxes but has supported increasing teachers' salaries, arguing that increased state revenue will pay for the increased budget spending. In 2017, Justice said that he opposed budget cuts and supported raising sales taxes. The libertarian Cato Institute gave Justice an "F" grade based on their positions, but Justice voiced his disagreement with the rating. Before Justice switched from a Democrat to a Republican, Senate President Mitch Carmichael called him "more Republican in his philosophies. Where he has gotten away from that a little bit is his tax-and-spend policies."

In February 2021, Justice urged Senator Joe Manchin to vote for the $1.9 trillion stimulus package proposed by President Joe Biden, warning against being "fiscally responsible" and adding, "I don't really know exactly what the thinking could possibly be there. I mean, we got people that are really hurting."

Abortion 
Justice had said that he does not support abortion, but that the Supreme Court had decided the issue. Later, he attended a rally supporting Amendment 1, a state constitutional amendment banning abortion once Roe v. Wade was overturned. He is considered pro-life and signed two anti-abortion bills into law.

Gun control 
Justice supports gun ownership and limited gun laws. In 2018, he signed into a law a bill allowing gun owners to keep their guns locked in vehicles on their employers' property, a bill the NRA supported. He also signed a bill legalizing hunting on Sundays on private land.

Healthcare 

Justice supports West Virginia's Medicaid expansion, which was implemented by the previous governor under the Affordable Care Act.

LGBTQ rights 
Justice has said that he respects the Supreme Court's decision on Obergefell v. Hodges, which legalized same-sex marriage nationwide, and that it is settled law. In 2017, he opposed a bill that would have allowed businesses to refuse service to LGBTQ customers.

Environmental policy 
According to the Charleston Gazette–Mail, Justice has equivocated on the scientific consensus on global warming. In a 2016 interview with the paper, he said: "There's documentation that would give one concern, and I don't think you should ignore that. At the same time, I think there's an awful lot of research that still should be done . . . I surely wouldn't sit here and say I am a believer in global warming, but I wouldn't sit here and say that I am not concerned."

At the beginning of his second term as governor, Justice said he was a believer in alternative energy, pointing to his welcoming of Clearway Energy Group to begin construction of a wind farm, which will increase state wind power by 15%. But he added, "it is frivolous for us to think that today our nation can go forward without coal or without gas. There will be a day we transition away from fossil fuels. But I frankly don’t believe that it is now."

COVID-19 vaccine distribution 

Despite being one of the poorest states in the nation, West Virginia was, early on, second only to Alaska in vaccine distribution for COVID-19. Since then, it has lagged behind the rest of the nation, ranking 40th in percentage of the population covered as of May 6, 2020. Justice encouraged West Virginians to get vaccinated with the slogan "Do It for Babydog", referring to his dog.

Personal life
Justice met his wife, Cathy (née Comer) in high school. They have two children. Justice and his wife are members of First Baptist Church in Beckley, a congregation of the American Baptist Churches USA. Justice is a lifelong fan of the New Orleans Saints of the National Football League (NFL), and spent $30 million to develop a training facility for the team to use in 2014 at the Greenbrier. Until 2019, he hosted the Greenbrier Classic, a PGA Tour event, at the Greenbrier annually.

Justice lives in Lewisburg, West Virginia. He was sued about his residency by former state house assistant minority whip Isaac Sponaugle on the basis that Justice did not live in the West Virginia Governor's Mansion in Charleston. The state constitution requires the governor to "reside at the seat of government", Charleston. The lawsuit was eventually put before the West Virginia State Supreme Court, which denied a motion for a writ of prohibition. Chief Justice Evan Jenkins defined "reside" in terms of statewide officeholders. On March 2, Justice resolved the lawsuit, agreeing to reside in Charleston and paying Sponaugle's legal fees.

Youth sports
Since 1992, Justice has been president of Beckley Little League. His participation has helped the program expand to over 1,000 children playing on 80 teams.

Having lived in Lewisburg since 2001, Justice has been the girls' basketball coach at Greenbrier East High School since 2003, winning the state championship in 2012. In 2011, he also became the head coach of the boys' basketball teams, a position from which he stepped down in September 2017. He was the only coach at the AAA level (the state's largest classification) to coach both the girls' and boys' basketball teams. Justice said that though he would put his business interests in a blind trust upon becoming governor, he would still coach basketball. Of the coaching position, he said, "There are three things I know that I can do, and that's shoot a shotgun, make a deal, and coach basketball. I'm excited about it." In February 2020, Justice apologized for calling the Woodrow Wilson High School girls' basketball players "a bunch of thugs" after a heated basketball game between Greenbrier East and Woodrow Wilson.

Electoral history

See also
 List of American politicians who switched parties in office
 List of richest American politicians
 Party switching in the United States

Notes

References

External links

 Governor of West Virginia official government website
 
 "Jim Justice" article in The West Virginia Encyclopedia
 Poll Numbers on Jim Justice 
 

|-

|-

|-

|-

|-

1951 births
2020 United States presidential electors
20th-century American businesspeople
21st-century American businesspeople
21st-century American politicians
American billionaires
American business executives
American businesspeople in the coal industry
American male golfers
American philanthropists
Businesspeople from West Virginia
Democratic Party governors of West Virginia
Golfers from West Virginia
Governors of West Virginia
High school basketball coaches in West Virginia
Living people
Marshall Thundering Herd men's golfers
Marshall University alumni
The Greenbrier people
People from Lewisburg, West Virginia
Republican Party governors of West Virginia
Tennessee Volunteers men's golfers
West Virginia Democrats
West Virginia Republicans
Woodrow Wilson High School (Beckley, West Virginia) alumni
Philanthropists from West Virginia